The Gospel Music Association (GMA) Dove Awards are presented annually by the Gospel Music Association for outstanding achievements in the Christian music industry.  The awards for Male and Female Vocalist of the Year Award has been awarded every year that the GMA has given the awards since 1969.
Eighteen different men and seventeen different women have won the award in forty-three years. James Blackwood won seven of the first eight (1969–1970, 1972–1975, 1977) Male Vocalist of the Year awards and is tied for the most with Steven Curtis Chapman (1990–1991, 1995, 1997–1998, 2000–2001).  Sandi Patty has the most Vocalist of Year awards overall with eleven (1982–1992).  Other multiple award winners include Natalie Grant (five), Sue Chenault Dodge (three), Michael English (three), Larnelle Harris (three), Russ Taff (three), Chris Tomlin (three), Twila Paris (three), Francesca Battistelli (two), Jeremy Camp (two), Cynthia Clawson (two), Steve Green (two), Brandon Heath (two), Dallas Holm (two), Nicole C. Mullen (two), Nichole Nordeman (two), Evie (two), Jaci Velasquez (two), and Cece Winans (two).  Chapman's seventh and most recent Vocalist of the Year award in 2001 came eleven years after his first in 1990—the longest span between awards.  In the awards forty-three year history, only in 1969, 1976, 1996, 1999, 2002, and 2006, did both the male and female award winners win for the first time in the same year. The most recent winners were Jason Crabb and Grant; it was Crabb's first win.

GMA officials rescinded the Dove Awards of 1971 due to solicitation of votes by the James Blackwood family.  James Blackwood and Sue Chenault would have won the male and female vocalist of the year awards, respectively. If the awards had not been removed, Blackwood would have had the most male vocalist of the year awards with eight. The only other year in which there were no awards was in 1979 when they were moved from October to April.

Winners

Footnotes

References

External links
Gospel Music Association
Dove Awards

 
Gospel music awards